Mélisey is a commune in the Haute-Saône department in the region of Bourgogne-Franche-Comté in eastern France.

Geography 
The area of Mélisey is 20.7 km2, the population density is 81 inhabitants per km2.

See also
Communes of the Haute-Saône department

Notable people
Thibaut Pinot, professional cyclist for FDJ

References

Communes of Haute-Saône